R. rex  may refer to:
 Rhinolophus rex, the king horseshoe bat, a bat species endemic to China
 Rhododendron rex, a plant species found in China, India and Myanmar
 Ripiphorus rex, a species of wedge-shaped beetle

See also
 Rex (disambiguation)